Elizabeth Seton High School is a private, all-girls Roman Catholic high school in Bladensburg, Maryland, United States. It is located in the Roman Catholic Archdiocese of Washington. Elizabeth Seton High School was established on March 15, 1957, and opened with an enrollment of 138 freshmen and a faculty of six Daughters of Charity in September 1959.  As early as 1965, the Maryland State Department of Education issued a Certificate of Approval to the school and in 1968 the Middle States Association of Colleges and Secondary Schools accredited Elizabeth Seton High School.

Elizabeth Seton was named one of 10 private schools of distinction by The Washington Post in 2005.

Background
An all-girls school, Elizabeth Seton was founded in 1959. It covers grades 9–12, and it can hold about 650 students.

The school was named in honor of the American Saint Elizabeth Ann Seton. School colors are scarlet, gold, and white. The mascot is a roadrunner. The school motto is "Light to know. Grace to do."

Enrollment
 Grades 9-12: 552 (2016-2017)
 Student/teacher ratio: 13-1
 Average class size: 16
 Student/computer ratio: 7.5-1; 1:1 Beginning with the class of 2019
 Class of 2015: 109

Notable alumni 

 Class of 1990: Muriel Bowser, current mayor of Washington, D.C.

References

External links
 School website

Catholic secondary schools in Maryland
Schools in Prince George's County, Maryland
Educational institutions established in 1959
Girls' schools in Maryland
1959 establishments in Maryland
Bladensburg, Maryland